Alberto Martínez Murcia (born 27 June 1998) is a Spanish marathon swimmer. He competed in the 2020 Summer Olympics.

References

1998 births
Living people
Spanish male long-distance swimmers
Olympic swimmers of Spain
Swimmers at the 2020 Summer Olympics
Sportspeople from Cartagena, Spain